Eric Freeman (born July 13, 1965) is an American actor best known for his role as Ricky Chapman in the 1987 slasher film Silent Night, Deadly Night Part 2.

Early life
Eric Freeman was born on July 13, 1965, in Raleigh, North Carolina.

Career
Freeman is best known for his role in the 1987 slasher film, Silent Night, Deadly Night Part 2. Released three years after the original, Freeman portrays Ricky Caldwell, the younger brother of the first film's killer Billy Chapman, who begins his own murder spree; it was his first lead role. Director and writer Lee Harry "offered [Freeman] very little in the form of direction", and his co-writer Joseph Earle encouraged the actor's over-the-top performance. Silent Night, Deadly Night Part 2 was commercially unsuccessful upon release and criticized for presenting footage of the original film as flashbacks for nearly half of its runtime. In the years since its release, the film was considered unintentionally comedic and a cult classic among horror fans. Freeman's outlandish performance, particularly his delivery of the line "garbage day", became the subject of an internet meme.

Other works
After Silent Night, Deadly Night Part 2, Freeman made appearances in various television shows including: a notable guest appearance on the TV show Superboy, playing the character Peter in the episode "The Woman Called Tiger Eye", appearances on several episodes of In Living Color, and his last being in the 1992 television series Dangerous Curves as "Johnny Strong" in the episode titled "Muscle Boys".

In 2004, the directors of Silent Night Deadly Night Part 2 tried to find him for the commentary track of the DVD release, but they were unable to track him down. In 2013 he returned to the public eye when he attended a screening of Silent Night, Deadly Night Part 2 in December 2013. He stated during an introduction speech that he had no idea that people were still interested in his roles and were looking for him until by chance someone he met mentioned to him that there were websites dedicated to finding him.

References

External links
 

1965 births
American male film actors
Living people
Male actors from North Carolina
Actors from Raleigh, North Carolina